{{Automatic taxobox
|image =Dendrobium wentianum - Flickr 003 (1).jpg
|image_caption = Dendrobium wentianum
|taxon = Dendrobium sect. Calyptrochilus
|authority = Schlechter 1905 
|subdivision_ranks = Species
|subdivision = See text
|type_species =Dendrobium lawesii 
|synonyms ={{Collapsible list|
Chromatotrichum 
Coelandria 
Maccraithea 
Oxyglossum 
Dendrobium sect. Capitata 
Dendrobium sect. Cuthbertsonia 
Dendrobium sect. Dolichocentrum 
Dendrobium sect. Eudendrobium subsect. Pycnostachyae 
Dendrobium sect. Glomerata 
Dendrobium sect. Glomerata subsect. Mesocentra Dendrobium sect. Oxyglossum Pedilonum sect. Calyoptrochilus Pedilonum sect. Cuthbertsonia Pedilonum sect. Oxyglossum 
}}
}}Dendrobium section Calyptrochilus is a section of the genus Dendrobium.

Description
Plants in this section have short pseudobulbs with lanceolate leaves.

Distribution
Plants from this section are found from Southeast Asia to Australia and New Guinea.

SpeciesDendrobium section Calyptrochilus'' comprises the following species:

References

Orchid subgenera